The Archives of Virology is a peer-reviewed scientific journal covering research in virology. It is published by Springer Science+Business Media and is the official journal of the Virology Division of the International Union of Microbiological Societies. It was established in 1939 as the Archiv für die gesamte Virusforschung and obtained its current title in 1975. According to the Journal Citation Reports, the journal has a 2020 impact factor of 2.574.

References

External links 
 

Monthly journals
English-language journals
Publications established in 1939
Springer Science+Business Media academic journals
Virology journals